Belostoma lutarium is a species of giant water bug in the family Belostomatidae. It is found in North America.

References

Belostomatidae
Hemiptera of North America
Taxa named by Carl Stål
Insects described in 1855
Articles created by Qbugbot